Choga may refer to:
 Choga (garment), a long-sleeved robe worn by Rajasthani men
 Choga (architecture), one of two traditional nature-friendly house types in Korea